The United States secretary of education is the head of the U.S. Department of Education. The secretary serves as the principal advisor to the president of the United States, and the federal government, on policies, programs, and activities related to all education in the United States. As a member of the Cabinet of the United States, the secretary is sixteenth in the line of succession to the presidency.

The current secretary of education is Miguel Cardona, who was confirmed by the Senate on March 1, 2021.

Function
The United States secretary of education is a member of the president's Cabinet and is the fifteenth in the United States presidential line of succession. This secretary deals with federal influence over education policy, and heads the United States Department of Education.

The secretary is advised by the National Advisory Committee on Institutional Quality and Integrity, an advisory committee, on "matters related to accreditation and to the eligibility and certification process for institutions of higher education."

List of secretaries
Prior to the creation of the Department of Education in 1979, Education was within the ambit of the Department of Health, Education, and Welfare.

Parties

Status

Health, Education, and Welfare

Education 
Source

References

External links

|-

United States, Education
Education
Secretary of Education
Education